The Northwest Association of Independent Schools (NWAIS) is a nonprofit membership association that provides accreditation, professional development and support services to over 110 elementary, middle, and secondary independent schools in Alaska, British Columbia, Idaho, Montana, Nevada, Oregon, Utah, Washington and Wyoming.

NWAIS is one of two major agencies that accredit private schools in the Pacific Northwest of the United States and Canada. The other is the Northwest Accreditation Commission.

Background 
Formerly the Pacific Northwest Association of Independent Schools (PNAIS), the NWAIS is a member of the National Association of Independent Schools.

Criteria for accreditation 
NWAIS develops accreditation standards in compliance with the Criteria for Effective Independent School Accreditation Practices, to foster collegial and ethical relations among its schools, and to safeguard and represent their interests.

NWAIS is recognized as a member of the International Council Advancing Independent School Accreditation (ICAISA), the international authority on independent school accreditation, representing thousands of schools in over 100 countries.

List of accredited schools 
The Independent School Facts report published by NAIS for the Northwest Association of Independent Schools, provides statistical data on select schools that are members of NWAIS. 

Some of the accredited schools for NWAIS are:


A 

 Abiqua Academy, Salem, Oregon
 The Adelson Educational Campus, Las Vegas, Nevada
 The Alexander Dawson School at Rainbow Mountain, Las Vegas
 American Heritage School, Utah
 Annie Wright School, Tacoma, Washington

B 

 The Bear Creek School, Redmond, Washington
 Bertschi School, Seattle, Washington
 Billings Middle School, Seattle
 The Bush School, Seattle

C 

 Cascades Academy of Central Oregon
 Catlin Gabel School, Portland, Oregon
 Charles Wright Academy, Tacoma
 Community School, Sun Valley, Idaho

D 

 Delphian School, Sheridan, Oregon

E 

 Eastside Catholic School, Sammamish, Washington
 Eastside Preparatory School, Kirkland, Washington
 Epiphany School, Seattle
 Eton School, Bellevue, Washington
 The Evergreen School, Shoreline, Washington
 Explorer West Middle School, Seattle

F 

 Forest Ridge School of the Sacred Heart, Bellevue
 Franciscan Montessori Earth School & Saint Francis Academy, Portland
 French American International School, Portland
 French American School of Puget Sound, Mercer Island, Washington

G 

 Giddens School, Seattle

H 

 Hamlin Robinson School, Seattle
 Holy Names Academy, Seattle
 Hyla Middle School, Bainbridge Island, Washington

I 

 The Island School, Bainbridge Island

J 

 Jackson Hole Community School, Jackson, Wyoming
 The Jewish Day School of Metropolitan Seattle, Bellevue
 The Journeys School of Teton Science Schools, Jackson

L 

 Lake Tahoe School, Incline Village, Nevada
 Lake Washington Girls Middle School, Seattle
 Lakeside School, Seattle
 The Little School, Bellevue

M 

 McGillis School, Salt Lake City, Utah
 The Meadows School, Las Vegas
 The Meridian School, Seattle
 Missoula International School, Missoula, Montana

N 

 The Northwest Academy, Portland
 The Northwest School, Seattle
 NOVA School, Olympia, Washington

O 

 Oak Hill School, Eugene, Oregon
 Open Window School, Bellevue
 Oregon Episcopal School, Portland
 The Overlake School, Redmond

P 
 Park City Day School, Park City, Utah
 The Perkins School, Seattle
 Portland Jewish Academy

R 

 Riverstone International School, Boise, Idaho
 Rowland Hall, Salt Lake City

S 

 Sage Ridge School, Reno, Nevada
 Saint George's School, Spokane, Washington
 Seabury School, Tacoma
 Seattle Academy of Arts and Sciences
 Seattle Country Day School
 Seattle Girls' School
 Seattle Hebrew Academy
 Seattle Jewish Community School
 Spruce Street School, Seattle
 St. Mary's School, Medford, Oregon
 St. Michaels University School, Victoria, Canada
 St. Thomas School, Medina, Washington

T 

 The Sage School, Hailey, Idaho

U 

 University Child Development School, Seattle
 University Prep, Seattle

V 

 Villa Academy, Seattle

W 

 Wasatch Academy, Mount Pleasant, Utah
 The Waterford School, Sandy, Utah
 Westside School, Seattle
 Woodinville Montessori School, Woodinville, Washington

References

External links
 Northwest Association of Independent Schools (official website)

Private and independent school organizations in the United States
School accreditors